Belonolaimidae is a family of nematodes belonging to the order Tylenchida.

Genera:
 Geocenamus Thorne & Malek, 1968
 Morulaimus Sauer, 1966
 Quinisulcius
 Tylenchorhynchus  Cobb, 1913

References

Nematodes